In the Shadow of the Moon may refer to:
 Two independently created non-fiction works about crewed lunar research programs:
 In the Shadow of the Moon (2007 film), about U.S. programs
 In the Shadow of the Moon (book) (2007), about both U.S. and Soviet programs

In the Shadow of the Moon (2019 film), a sci-fi thriller

See also 
 In the Shadow of the Moons, autobiographical book subtitled "...  My Life in the Reverend Sun Myung Moon's Family"